Cannabis Corpse is a cannabis-themed death metal band. Cannabis Corpse formed in Richmond, Virginia in 2006 under the Forcefield label. Since then, Cannabis Corpse has released six LPs and two EPs. The band features members of Municipal Waste and Antietam 1862. Their name originates as a parody of the name of veteran death metal band Cannibal Corpse. While the Cannabis Corpse songs are fully original, their album and song titles are parodies of many other death metal bands' album and song titles (e.g. "Tube of the Resinated" vs Cannibal Corpse's "Tomb of the Mutilated").

History
In 1999, bassist/guitarist Philip "Landphil" Hall coined the "Cannabis Corpse" name with his brother Josh "HallHammer" Hall. The original line up had Landphil on vocals and a recruit named John Gonzalez (of Nehema) on guitar. John moved to Hawaii and the band was put on hold until 2006, when Phil bought a multitrack recorder. The brothers, along with Andy "Weedgrinder" Horn recorded a demo for the band, which eventually became Blunted at Birth. Soon thereafter, they were signed as the first band to Richmond, Virginia-based Forcefield Records whose founders were personal friends.

Cannabis Corpse appear briefly in the BBC film In The Loop.

Cannabis Corpse toured Europe in 2013 with Ghoul, and announced that they had signed to Season of Mist on their website.

Band members
Current
Philip "Landphil" Hall – bass (2006–present), vocals (2012–present), guitars (2006–2008, 2012–2015), keyboards (2011–2012)
Josh "HallHammer" Hall – drums (2006–present)
Adam Guilliams – lead guitar (2018–present)

Previous members
Nick "Nikropolis" Poulos – lead guitar (2008–2012)
Andy "Weedgrinder" Horn – vocals (2006–2012)
Brent Purgason – lead guitar (2012–2014)
Brandon Ellis – lead guitar (2014–2015)
Ray Suhy – rhythm guitar (2015–2018)

Touring
Vic "Con-Vic" Anti – rhythm guitar (2009)
Adam Jinch – lead guitar (2017)

Guest appearances
Jeff "Wartom" Bush (2006, guest vocals on "Force Fed Shitty Grass")
Will "Power" Towles (2006, guest vocals on "When Weed Replaces Life")
Randy Blythe (Jan. 7, 2012, guest appearance at the 'Cory Smoot Benefit Show' and at the 'Welcome Home Randy Blythe show')
Chris Barnes (2014, guest vocals on "Individual Pot Patterns")
 Trevor Strnad (2014, guest vocals on "With Their Hash He Will Create")

Discography

Albums
Blunted at Birth (2006)
Tube of the Resinated (2008) 
Beneath Grow Lights Thou Shalt Rise (2011) 
From Wisdom to Baked (2014)
Left Hand Pass (2017)
Nug So Vile  (2019)

EPs
The Weeding (2009) 
Splatterhash (2013) – split with Ghoul

Compilations
Choice Nugs (2017)

References

External links
Cannabis Corpse on Facebook
Cannabis Corpse on Myspace
Cannabis Corpse on Last.fm

American death metal musical groups
American thrash metal musical groups
Cannabis music
Comedy rock musical groups
Heavy metal musical groups from Virginia
Music of Richmond, Virginia
Musical groups from Virginia
Musical trios
Season of Mist artists